Hala Legionów in Kielce is a multi-purpose sports facility, opened on 25 August 2006. Its most popular tenant is the Polish handball club, Vive Kielce. Hala Legionów has 3,030 permanent and 1,170 additional seats, totaling 4,200 of maximum capacity.

References 

Buildings and structures in Kielce
Handball venues in Poland